Harry Herbert Aubrey (July 5, 1881 – September 18, 1953) was an American Major League Baseball infielder. He played for the Boston Beaneaters during the  season.

References

Major League Baseball infielders
Boston Beaneaters players
Baseball players from Missouri
Sportspeople from St. Joseph, Missouri
1881 births
1953 deaths
Marion Glass Blowers players
Wheeling Stogies players
Providence Grays (minor league) players
Montreal Royals players
Providence Clamdiggers (baseball) players
Scranton Miners players
Syracuse Stars (minor league baseball) players
Haverhill Hustlers players
Worcester Busters players
Lowell Grays players
Lawrence Barristers players
Shamokin (minor league baseball) players